Nie Xiaoqian or Nieh Hsiao-chien is the lead female character in "The Magic Sword", a fantasy story in Pu Songling's short story collection Strange Stories from a Chinese Studio.  Pu describes her appearance as "gorgeous; girl in paintings". The story has been adapted into numerous films and television dramas. The name is commonly rendered as Nip Siu Sin in Hong Kong adaptations in accordance with its Cantonese pronunciation.

Plot
Nie Xiaoqian is introduced as a beautiful female ghost. She died at the age of 18 and was interred in an old temple in Jinhua, Zhejiang. Nie is coerced to participate in ritual murders in the service of a demon. A pale-faced scholar, Ning Caichen, is going to Beijing to take a civil service examination. Though Nie attempts to prey upon Ning Caichen, he resists her and takes her from her haunt.  As Ning's sickly wife slowly dies, Nie fulfills expectations of filial piety as she takes upon the household chores.  Once Ning's wife dies, he is free to pursue Nie.  Nie's good works earn her humanity back.  She and Ning marry and conceive a child, representative of Nie's restoration.

Film and television

References

Female characters in literature
Stories within Strange Tales from a Chinese Studio
Characters in Chinese fiction
Ghosts in written fiction
Jinhua
Short stories adapted into films